The Type 103 Lütjens class was the last class of destroyers in service with the German Navy. The ships were US  guided missile destroyers but with some modifications to meet German requirements.

They were replaced by the new Sachsen-class frigates, designated frigate even though they are much larger and more capable in all aspects than the Lütjens-class destroyers.

Development
The three Lütjens destroyers were purchased from the US to provide air defence.

For German use, they received the following modifications:
 Communication systems according to German standards. The Lütjens class had more aerials and a second mast mounted on the aft funnel. The large air surveillance radar was positioned further aft (above the funnel).
In turn, the new antennas and radar location meant that the funnels had to be modified. On the Lütjens the exhaust gases were emitted sideways with two pipes on the port and starboard side of each funnel.
 New location of the sonar array. The Lütjens had their sonar dome located in a bulge directed forward in the bow and not under the bow to reduce the ship's draft.
 Better crew accommodation.

Service
The three ships in the class were commissioned in 1969 and 1970. In service, they formed the 1. Zerstörergeschwader ("first destroyer squadron") based in Kiel.

The Lütjens class was upgraded to Type 103A in the 1970s with new digital fire-control computers and better missiles for the old Tartar SM1 missile system. The boilers were also converted to burn lighter oil for logistical reasons instead of the heavy fuel oil that needs to be preheated.

A second major refit was undertaken in the 1980s when the ships were upgraded to Type 103B. Missiles were upgraded with a single Modified Mark 13 missile launcher fitted able to fire the SM-1MR surface-to-air missile and Harpoon anti-ship missile. A typical balance was 32 of the former and 8 of the latter. Fire control was improved with upgraded computers and a new AN/SPG-60 radar which also provided illumination for the missiles.

In the 1990s, the ships in the class each received two RIM-116 RAM launchers and Chaff launchers.

With the decommissioning of Lütjens (D185) on December 18, 2003 the age of steam ended for the German Navy. Mölders (D186) became a museum ship at the German Navy Museum in Wilhelmshaven.

Speeds over  could be sustained for only a limited time due to the enormous fuel consumption. Three boilers made  achievable. For any speed beyond  all four boilers were needed.

List of ships

All three ships were built by Bath Iron Works in the United States. They were named after famous German officers who died in World War II: Günther Lütjens who had commanded the  task group, the fighter ace Werner Mölders of the Luftwaffe, and Field Marshal Erwin Rommel.

References